Jordan Lewis Gibson (born 28 February 1998) is an English professional footballer who plays as a winger for Carlisle United.

Career

Early career
Born in Birmingham, Gibson played youth football with Rangers, joining the Scottish club in June 2015.

Bradford City
After being released by Rangers, he went on trial with Bradford City, signing a one-year contract with the club in August 2017. He made his professional debut on 29 August 2017, in a Football League Trophy game, and started to be considered part of the first team squad in November 2017. The next month he stated that he wished his break into the first team. He scored his first goal for Bradford in a 2–1 loss against Oldham Athletic on 3 February 2018.

In May 2018 he signed a new two-year contract with Bradford City. Later that month he criticised comments made about him by former City manager Simon Grayson.

In September 2018 he stated that he wished to play more first-team football, and also praised young teammates Eliot Goldthorp and Reece Staunton.

In January 2019 he was linked with a loan move to EFL League Two side Stevenage. The deal was completed on transfer deadline day, 31 January 2019. Gibson scored on his final game for the club, a 2–0 win over Cheltenham Town on the final day of the season, as Stevenage missed out on a play-off spot.

After his loan deal ended and he returned to Bradford City, new manager Gary Bowyer confirmed that he was in his first-team plans for the 2019–20 season. After starting the first game of the season, Gibson said that his self-belief had been encouraged by Bowyer. Gibson missed City's first victory of the season due to a hamstring injury, and remained injured into October 2019. By early December he was nearing fitness.

On 26 May 2020 it was announced that he was one of 10 players who would leave Bradford City when their contract expired on 30 June 2020. During his time with Bradford City he made 11 starts, appearing for six different managers.

St Patrick's Athletic
In July 2020 he signed for Irish club St Patrick's Athletic. Gibson made his debut on 31 July 2020 in a 1–1 draw away to champions Dundalk at Oriel Park. On 3 October 2020, Gibson scored his first goal for the club, netting what turned out to be the winning goal in a 2–1 win away to Cork City at Turners Cross. He scored in what turned out to be the last of his 15 appearances for the club, opening the scoring in a 2–1 loss at home to Dublin rivals Bohemians on 9 November 2020 as his side missed out on European football on the last day of the season.

Sligo Rovers
On 4 January 2021 it was announced that Gibson had signed for fellow League of Ireland Premier Division club Sligo Rovers. He scored his first goal for the club in his second appearance, away to Waterford on 26 March 2021, setting up the equalizer for Romeo Parkes before going on to score a spectacular winner in the 53rd minute.

Carlisle United
He returned to England on 30 August 2021, signing with Carlisle United.

Career statistics

References

1998 births
Living people
Footballers from Birmingham, West Midlands
English footballers
Rangers F.C. players
Bradford City A.F.C. players
Stevenage F.C. players
St Patrick's Athletic F.C. players
Sligo Rovers F.C. players
Carlisle United F.C. players
English Football League players
League of Ireland players
Association football wingers
English expatriate footballers
British expatriates in Ireland
Expatriate association footballers in the Republic of Ireland